José Rivero (born 20 September 1955) is a Spanish professional golfer.

Career
He started his golf career as a caddie and turned professional in 1973. He was a full member of the European Tour from 1983 to 2001 and he won four European Tour events. He made the top fifteen on the Order of Merit five times, including a best of tenth in 1988.

Rivero was a member of the first two winning European Ryder Cup teams after the inclusion of Continental European players, at The Belfry in 1985 and Muirfield Village in 1987. He represented Spain in the Alfred Dunhill Cup and the World Cup on many occasions, winning the latter in 1984 in partnership with José María Cañizares.

Rivero became eligible for senior golf in September 2005. He played four events on the European Senior Tour that year and placed in the top six in each of them. His first win as a senior came at the 2006 DGM Barbados Open.

Professional wins (9)

European Tour wins (4)

European Tour playoff record (0–1)

Other wins (2)
1984 World Cup (with José María Cañizares)
1998 Oki APG (Spain)

European Senior Tour wins (3)

European Senior Tour playoff record (1–0)

Results in major championships

Note: Rivero only played in The Open Championship.

CUT = missed the half-way cut
"T" indicates a tie for a place

Team appearances
Hennessy Cognac Cup (representing Spain): 1984
World Cup (representing Spain): 1984 (winners), 1987, 1988, 1990, 1991, 1992, 1993, 1994
Ryder Cup (representing Europe): 1985 (winners), 1987 (winners)
Dunhill Cup (representing Spain): 1986, 1987, 1988, 1989, 1990, 1991, 1992, 1993, 1994, 1995
Kirin Cup (representing Europe): 1988

References

External links

Spanish male golfers
European Tour golfers
European Senior Tour golfers
PGA Tour Champions golfers
Ryder Cup competitors for Europe
Golfers from Madrid
1955 births
Living people
20th-century Spanish people
21st-century Spanish people